The Mising, sometimes called Miri, are a Tibeto-Burmese indigenous ethnic group inhabiting parts of the Northeast Indian states of Assam and Arunachal Pradesh. They are part of Tani group of people of Northeast India.

Etymology 
 is an endonym and literally means "man of the soil." , on the other hand, is an exonym commonly applied by plains Assamese people. There is still much scholarly debate on the origins of this term: some colonial scholars argued 'miri' referred to their status as intermediaries between plains peoples in the Brahmaputra Valley and hill tribes to the north, while others such as Grierson (1909) thought it meant "gentleman," while Crooks interpreted it as "hill man." More recent scholarship associated  with religious functionaries in some Tani hill-tribes.

History
The Misings belong to the greater group of Tani people, who speak Tibeto-Burmese languages of the Sino-Tibetan family, inhabiting parts of the Indian states of Assam and Arunachal Pradesh and Tibet Autonomous Region of China. Tibetans refers the Tani people as the Lhobhas; lho means south and bha means people, Lhobhas means "southerners" i.e the people who reside in South Tibet and the area inhabited by them in medieval text were called Lhoyü.

The earliest mention of the Misings comes from the Ahom kingdom in the early 17th century, when the Misings were still independent hill-tribes to the north of the Brahmaputra valley. In 1615, the Misings raided Ahom territory and the force sent to subdue them failed. In 1655, the Misings launched another raid which resulted in a successful counterraid by Ahom forces during which the Misings were subjugated. They agreed to pay an annual tribute to the Ahoms and gave 12 men to the Ahoms for the two they burnt. Afterwards many Misings were given high positions in Ahom administration, evidence of their greater cultural contact with the Assamese compared with other hill-tribes. 

There is no written history of Misings about their migration from the Himalayas to the plains of Assam but history was passed down orally in the form of folk songs and stories by the ancestors from generation to generation and is still prevalent among their society. Although, they were initially hill dwellers, they later migrated to the plains and started living on the banks of rivers of Assam. The reason for this change of habitat is not known, but one theory says that the Misings presently living in plains of Assam were not one single tribe, but it evolved into one when many tribes from various Tani tribes of Arunachal Pradesh migrated to the plains of Assam. This explains the presence of many Mising clans with different Mising dialects as well as different levels of development. As per historians, the Mishings came down to the plains in two groups, the Barogam and the Dohgam. Other theories stated that the Misings in hill regions of the Subansiri-Siang region were subordinate to the Abors, and so migrated to the plains to escape their plight. Mising folktales speak of an ambush of Burmese soldiers by Misings on the Brahmaputra, implying Misings were established in Assam before the Burmese invasions of 1817. However during the early British period Misings continued to move down to the plains but even they would continue to face raids from their former Abor overlords. British administrators also tried to force many Misings back to the hills into their old subordinate status. However when the British pacified the hill tribes, the Misings were able to live in peace in the plains.

Autonomy movement  
The Misings currently has some state autonomy under the Mising Autonomous Council (MAC), which was formed in 1995 following violent clashes in early 90s for greater autonomy. MAC includes 40 constituencies in eight upper Assam districts comprising core areas and satellite areas. Executive councillor (EC) from 36 constituency are elected democratically while 4 other members are represented by the ruling government of Assam. Tensions exist between the Mising tribe and other communities regarding the inclusion of few Non-Mising villages in MAC. Although no violence occurred between Misings and non-Misings, however some non-Mising unions clashed with the police. MAC area constitutes more than 60% ST population and other communities are a minority. Most of the Misings today reside in the districts of Dhemaji and Lakhimpur, bordering Arunachal Pradesh, while a significant number is present in the Majuli district as well. Since 1983, Mising organizations have been demanding Sixth Schedule status under the Constitution of India. Various Mising nationalist organizations have been formed, like Takam Mising Porin Kébang (Mising Students' Union) and Mising Bahne Kebang (Mising Council) after inclusion of education in Mising areas.

Population
According to the Census of India conducted in 2011, the population of Mising in Assam is approximately 7 lakhs with a good sex ratio. They live in 10 districts of Assam: Dhemaji, Lakhimpur, Sonitpur, Tinsukia, Dibrugarh, Sivasagar, Majuli, Charaideo, Jorhat and Golaghat, and in three districts of Arunachal Pradesh: East Siang district, Lower Dibang Valley, and Lohit. The most prominent Mising villages in Arunachal Pradesh include Oyan, Namsing, of East Siang district. In Lohit District's Namsai, a good number of Mising are found, especially in the areas around Silatoo Mising village.

Culture

Music and dance

The Misings have a variety of different types of folk songs.

Ahbang - It is a verse of hymn of praise and worship of gods and goddesses. Ahbang is sung by the Mibu (priest) at rituals. There is also community Ahbangs generally used in Pobua or Porag, a ritual festival, praying for better crops, health and happiness.

Kaban - It is one of the oldest forms of Mising folk songs. It is lamentation music and recalls sad events. At the death of a dear one, the women burst out into a sort of cry and song which for an outsider may sound funny.

Tebo Tekang - It is a romantic lyric, narrating some love encounters.

Siuhung Nitom - It is a melancholic song, sung in lonely places like jungle.

Bini - These are lullabies sung either at home or in the field, taking babies to places of work. The baby is tied to the back of the mother or the young babysitter.

Midang Nitom - This is usually sung at the time of ushering in a bride to her new home, often in order to tease her. These too are rather melancholic, since they depict the sadness of brides wailing at being separated from her family, friends and the familiar childhood environment.

Oi Nitom - It is the most popular form of Mising folk song, sung by Mising youths when they are working or moving about the fields, woods, etc. It is an integral part of the Mising Soman (dance). It has a variety of themes ranging from romance, humour, tragedy, and socio-cultural motifs. Each line in an Oi-Nitom is of seven syllables.

Misings have rich folk music. Apart from dumdum, luhpi, lehnong, marbang, bali, etc. used in Gumrag dance and which are common to other locals, the following are the typical type of traditional instruments played in Mising folk music: ejuk tapung, derki tapung, tumbo tapung, tutok tapung, ketpong tapung, gekre tapung, dendun, dumpak corég, gunggang, tulung etc. These are mostly wind instruments made of bamboo. Yoxa (sword) is used as a musical instrument by the priest (Mibu) during religious dances.

There are many types of Mising dances, and each has its particular rules. Gumrag is performed five times in circles. Drums and cymbals are the usual musical instruments for the dances.

Mibu Dagnam - It is a priestly dance performed mostly during Po:rag, the harvesting festival, observed in the Murong, the community hall of the Misings. The priest sings the Ahbang while performing this ritual dance.

Selloi - This is a kind of merry-making song and dance often performed for fun, by young boys and girls with the accompaniment of drums or cymbals. It marks the beginning of the influx of the Mising people from hills to plains of Assam.

Lereli - Occasionally, all sections of Mising people indulge in singing and dancing lereli in sheer fun and merriment, especially at meeting old friends.

Ejug Tapung Sohman - This is a very ancient form of dance performed to the accompaniment of ejug tapung, a wind instrument resembling the snake charmer's been.

Gumrag Sohman (Gumrag Paksong) - This dance is performed on the occasion of Ali-Aye-Ligang and in Mising Bihu.

Lotta Sohman - This dance is performed on any occasion, as an expression of joy or community celebration. Old and young, all join in these dances

Marriage

The Misings are a patrilineal and patriarchal society and so, as per customary law, only the male children are entitled to inherit the property of a family. However, daughters can inherit the clothes and jewelry of their mothers.

Marriages amongst the Misings take place in four ways: formal marriages through negotiation(Midang), marriage by elopement(Dugla-lanam), marriage through a very simple ceremony, and marriage by force (Kumna-sola-lanam; this was not a practice of the Mising tribe but was the mentality of the parents like other people too). The last one, in which a man makes a woman his wife against her will by whisking her away from someplace and starting to live together, is no longer in practice. Extreme poverty or inconvenience force families to arrange a marriage of the third kind, in which a few elders, invited to the house of the groom, bless the would-be couple over a few bowls of rice beer – and the wedding is over. The most common form of marriage in rural areas even today is the one by elopement. When a boy is in love with a girl and intends to marry her, but cannot afford the cost of a formal marriage, or expects some opposition to the marriage from some quarter, or would like to start a conjugal life without delay, he chooses elopement with the girl as the best option. More often than not, marriages by elopement are followed by due social recognition through simple formalities. Formal marriages are arranged through two or three stages of negotiation, but although arranged by parents or guardians, the marriage of a boy and a girl totally unknown to each other, would be very rare. Formal marriages amongst them appear to have been influenced to a great extent by the practice of such marriages amongst their neighbors in the valley. It is now common for the educated and the well-to-do parents to perform the marriages of their children in the formal way. Polygamy is permissible as per customary law, but it is not looked upon as an act of honor anymore. Polyandry is unknown altogether. Widows or widowers can remarry. Customary law allows divorces, but they are not very common. It is also customary for a groom's parents or guardians to pay bride price – mostly nominal – to the parents or guardians of the bride. Clan endogamy is taboo.

Social structure
Although administrators and outsiders saw the Misings as a single group, the Misings were in fact made up of many autonomous small tribes. Each of these tribes is settled in a contiguous region and has a distinct identity and folklore. Mising is used as an umbrella term for all these various tribes who migrated to the plains from the same region in the hills. However all Misings speak the same language and follow similar rituals, so most consider them to be a single community. This commonality was also recognized by educated Misings in the early 20th century.

The Misings believe in Abotani as their ancestor and is supposed to be a son of mother Sun and father Moon of the Heavenly abode. The Mising people inhabiting by the plains believe Gu:mín as one of the earliest ancestors, the forefather of a lineal family of Abotani. The sons of Guhmín are grouped in multiple opin, or clans, the names of which are represented by the existing surnames in the society. They are all blood-related brothers with a social restriction of the matrimonial relationship among them.

The Misings have other groupings such as Moyengia, Oyengia, and Sayengia etc., which do not correlate to opin. Misings were also divided into Barogam and Dohgam, which was an administrative system introduced during Chutia Kingdom. The concepts of Guhmin and Opin have remained the basis of Mising social structure.

The Opin of Guhmin are all blood-related brothers known as urom bibosunam bírrang, originating from a common ancestor father and there is no restriction in offering prayers in the rituals in common platform generations together. There is another form of brotherhood existing in the society which has been traditionally accepted as an affiliated brother or tomin sunam bírrang from different opin. In both types of brotherhood marriage among themselves is forbidden in the society.

The different opin include: Doley, Pegu , Bori, Gam, Charoh, Dao, Darig, Dang, Jimey, Kuli, Kutum, Kumbang, Kaman, Kardong, Kari, Lagachu, Loying, Modi, Moyong, Morang, Mili, Medok, Medhi,  Misong, Narah, Ngate, Pangging,Pasar, Perme, Pertin, Pait, Pagag, Patir, Patiri, Padi, Patgiri, Panyang,  Payeng, Payun, Pao, Padun, Regon, Ratan, Chungkrang, Chintey, Charoh, Taw, Taye, Taid, Tayeng, Tayung and Yein.

There are further classification as Delu, Dagdung, Dagtok, Mohying, Padam, Pagro, Oyan.

He presided at the sittings of the village council, the Kebang, which deliberated upon different matters concerning the wellbeing of the village as well as complaints of individual members or groups in the community. The Kebang was the legal, judicial and executive authority of the community, although the final say on all matters, barring the ones relating to their faith, was that of the Ga:m. Cases of social and criminal offenses were heard by the Kebang, and persons found guilty were penalized. The Gam has been replaced with Gambura (gaonburha in mipak language) a petty village level agent of the government, since the days of the British. Kebang now denotes any organization, similar to sabha and sangha in other Indian languages.

Housing
A traditional Mising house is stilted. It has a thatched top and is patterned simply like the letter 'I.' It is built usually with wooden posts, beams, truss and supporting forks, but bamboo is used extensively for flooring and roofing. The more the number of nuclear families living in the same house, the longer the ‘ I ’ would be. The granary is built a little close to the house and a cowshed too would not be far away. Mising villages are generally large in size, consisting of around fifty-to-sixty households on an average.

Clothing 
The traditional craft of weaving is a very important aspect of Mising culture. It is an exclusive preserve of the Mising woman, who starts her training in the craft even before she reaches her teens. All clothes the Mising wear are woven by the women of the household. Men wear cotton jackets (Mibu Galuk), light cotton towels, endi shawls, thick loin cloths, and, occasionally, even shirtings. Women wear a variety of clothes, depending on the occasion. The ege is a lower garment, comprising a sheet of cotton. Above this may be draped a ri:bi or Gaseng, both cotton sheets used to cover the ege and a blouse. However, while the ri:bi has narrow stripes, the gaseng has broad stripes of contrastive colours. Instead may be worn a Gero: a sheet, usually off-white, wrapped round the waist to cover the lower part of the body, or round the chest to cover the body down to the knees or so, or a seleng gasor: a light cotton sheet, worn occasionally instead of a ri:bi or a gaseng. Other forms of clothing include the riya, a long, comparatively narrow, sheet, wrapped, a bit tightly, round the chest. Married women will wear the segrek, a loose piece of cloth, wrapped round the waist to cover the ege down to the knees. Other accessories include a po:tub: a scarf used to protect the head, and nisek: a piece of cloth to carry a baby with.

Before yarn, produced by modern textile factories, was available in the market, Misings used to grow cotton and obtain cotton yarn by spinning. The use of endi yarn, obtained from worms fed on leaves of castor-oil plants, was once common amongst them. However, they have learnt the use of muga (silk obtained from silkworms fed on a kind of tall tree, called som in Assamese) and of paat (silk obtained from silkworms fed mulberry leaves) from neighbouring indigenous communities in the valley. Even now Mising women weave cloths, using muga and paat silk, very sparingly. Thus weaving cotton clothes is the principal domain of the Mising weaver. 

The Mising also have a special and complex blanket called gadu, fluffy on one side, and woven on a traditional loin loom. The warp consists of cotton spun into thick and strong yarn, and the weft of cotton turned into soft yarn and cut into small pieces for insertion, piece by piece, to form the fluff. Weaving a gadu is a very laborious affair like weaving expensive carpets, requiring the weaver to spend a lot of time on her loin loom, and, as the younger women in a family would, generally, not have enough time for such a work, it is the aging ones staying at home that do it. There has been a drastic decline of the gadu craft during the years after independence because of the availability of inexpensive blankets in the market.

Economy

Agriculture is the lifeblood of the economy of the Misings. They grow different varieties of rice paddy, some of which they sow in spring for harvesting in summer, some others being transplanted during the rainy season and harvested in autumn. They also grow mustard, pulses, maize, vegetables, tobacco, bamboo, areca, etc., chiefly for their own use, with the exception of mustard, which brings them some cash. Generally speaking, they are poor horticulturists. The women contribute to the income of the family by rearing pigs, fowls and, occasionally, goats. They are buyers, not makers, of metallic utensils and jewelry. They are also not known for carpentry. However, they make almost all the tools required for their day-to-day life, such as baskets, carry bags, trays, boxes, fish traps of various kinds, hencoops, etc., using bamboo and cane as material. The wooden items they make include their boat-shaped mortar and the pestle, and, of course, canoes, so indispensable for riparian people living in flood-prone areas. Today a small percentage of their population have different categories of jobs, especially in the public sector, small trading, etc. as sources of income

Religion
The Misings follow their own traditions, called Donyi Polo, the Sun and the Moon God. They are still mainly animists and adopted some aspects of Vaishnavism after the Bhakti movement that was started by Sankardev, (1449-1568 A.D.), the saint-poet of Assam.

Sedi then created Diling, whose descendant Pedong gave birth to Dopang, Domi and Doshing. Domi's son, Miniyong, was the ancestor of the Mishings.

They believe in different supernatural beings haunting the earth, usually unseen. These supernatural beings fall into four categories: uyu or ui - usually malevolent spirits inhabiting the waters, the woods, the skies, etc. capable of causing great harm including physical devastation, urom po-sum - hovering spirits of the dead, who may cause illness or other adverse conditions, guhmeen-sohing - benevolent ancestral spirits, and epom-yapom - spirits inhabiting tall, big trees, who are generally not very harmful, but who may abduct human beings occasionally, cause some physical or mental impairment and release them later. Barring the epom-yapom, all the supernatural beings need to be propitiated with sacrificial offerings (usually domestic fowl), both periodically and on specific occasions of illness, disaster, etc. Even the benevolent guardian spirits are propitiated from time to time for the all-round wellbeing of a household. Nature worship as such is not a common practice amongst Misings. But the god of thunder is propitiated from time to time, and although not worshipped or propitiated, the Sun (who they call Ane-Donyi ‘Mother Sun’) and the Moon (who they call Abu Polo ‘Father Moon’) are invoked on all auspicious occasions.

The leader of their animistic faith is called a mibu (also called miri earlier), their priest or medicine man, who is supposed to be born with special powers of communion with supernatural beings. While mibus are on their way out amongst the Misings owing to the introduction of modern education and healthcare amongst them, propitiation of supernatural beings continue to mark their religious life.

In addition, they have embraced in the valley some kind of a monotheistic Hinduism as passed on to them by one of the sects of the Vaishnavism of Sankardeva. As faiths, the two forms, animism, and Vaishnavism, are poles apart, but they have coexisted in the Mising society without any conflict whatsoever, primarily because the form of Vaishnavism, as they have been practising it, has not interfered with their traditional customs (drinking rice beer and eating pork, or using them on socio-religious occasions, for instance). Their religious life in the valley has thus assumed a fully syncretistic character.

Festivals
Mising people celebrate various festivals, though, the two chief traditional festivals of the Misings are the Ali-Ayé-Lígang, and the Po:rag, both connected with their agricultural cycle.

Ali-Ayé-Lígang is a festival marking the beginning of the sowing season, and marks the start of a new agricultural calendar. Ali-Ayé means seeds in a row, and Lígang means sowing of seeds. Ali-Ayé-Lígang starts on the second Wednesday of February, considered an auspicious day, and lasts for five days. Ali-Ayé-Lígang is a five-day festival. The celebrations begin with the heads of families sowing ceremonially rice paddy seeds in a corner of their respective rice fields in the morning hours and praying for crop abundance. Young men and women participate in the occasion by singing and dancing at night in the courtyard of every household in the villages to the accompaniment of drums, cymbals, and a gong. The gong is not used on any festive occasion other than the Ali-Ayé Lígang. Similarly, the drums have specific beats for this festival. The troupe accepts from each household offers of rice beer and fowls. After the singing and dancing in this way is over, the youths hold a feast on the third day.

Po:rag is the post-harvest festival of the Misings. Harvesting of paddy rice in autumn is very common now amongst the Misings and so a Po:rag is usually observed now sometime in early winter or early spring. But there was a time when a harvest in summer too was very common amongst them and so Po:rag was celebrated earlier in the months of August or September also. It is a very expensive three-day festival (reduced to two days or even one these days, depending on the extent of preparation on the part of the organizers in terms of items of food and drinks) and so held once in two-to-three years or so. Entertainment during the celebrations is open to everyone, young and old, of the village, and invitations are also extended formally to many guests, including some people of neighbouring villages, to join the celebrations. More significantly, it is customary on this occasion to invite the women who hail from the village but have been married to men of other villages and places, far and near. This makes Po:rag a grand festival of reunion. Moreover, apart from the husbands of the women so invited, a group of young men and women, who can sing and dance, is expected to accompany each of them. No formal singing, dancing and drumming contests are organized, but the congregation of many singers, dancers, and drummers from different villages, in addition to the ones in the village, turns the festival into some kind of a friendly music and dance tournament, as it were. This has an amplifying effect on the air of joy that the festival exudes. The sole responsibility for organizing the festival is vested in a body of young men and women, called Meembir-yamey (literally, ‘young women-young men’). The organization is run with a good degree of discipline, following the provisions of an unwritten but well-respected code of conduct. Erring individuals are given hearings and penalized if found guilty.

Another occasion called Dobur is an animistic rite performed occasionally by the village community by sacrificing a sow and some hens for different purposes, such as to avert a likely crop failure and ensure general well being of the community, or to avert the evil effects of a wrongdoing on the part of a member of the community, etc. The form of observance of Dobur varies according to the purpose. In the most common form, the younger male members of a village beat the walls of every house in the village from one end to the other with big sticks to drive away the ghosts and goblins hiding in nook and corner and perform the sacrificial rite at some distance away from the village, and hold a feast there. Anyone passing unwittingly through the venue of the rite has to stop in the place till evening or pay a fine.

Some of the features of Bihu dances, boys and girls dancing together for instance, may have been borrowed from the Misings.

Notable people 
Indira Miri, Indian educationist.
Shakuntala Doley Gamlin, IAS officer.
Ganesh Kutum, politician.
Naba Kumar Doley, politician.
Tabu Taid, Indian author.
Jadav Payeng, environmental activist.
Bhubon Pegu, politician.
Lalit Kumar Doley, Indian politician.
Mrinal Miri, Indian philosopher.
Bharat Narah, politician
Rajib Lochan Pegu, politician
Tarun Chandra Pamegam,Writer

See also
 Takam Mising Porin Kebang

References

External links

 Mishing Autonomous Council (MAC)
 Societial adaptation to environmental changes: natural resources management and shifting definitions of territory among the Mishing tribe in the Brahmaputra River floodplain (Assam, NE India), by Emilie Cremin, PhD in Geography, University Paris 8 (France).

Tribes of Assam
Ethnic groups in Northeast India